Della Rocca is the name of
Bartolomeo della Rocca (1467–1504), Italian scholar
Enrico Morozzo Della Rocca (1807–1897), Italian general
Francesco Della Rocca (born 1987), Italian footballer
Giacomo della Rocca (1592–1605), Italian painter
Jason Della Rocca (born 1974), American software developer
Luigi Della Rocca (born 1982), Italian footballer

See also
 David Della Rocco (born 1952), actor
Rocca (disambiguation)
De la Roca (disambiguation)

Italian-language surnames